Dimitar Kamburski (born 28 January 1966) is a Bulgarian rower. He competed in the men's eight event at the 1988 Summer Olympics.

References

External links
 

1966 births
Living people
Bulgarian male rowers
Olympic rowers of Bulgaria
Rowers at the 1988 Summer Olympics
Sportspeople from Plovdiv